LKM or lkm may refer to:

 7, Lok Kalyan Marg, the official residence and principal workplace of the Prime Minister of India
"Liver Kidney Microsomal", the target of an Anti-LKM antibody
 LKM Unia Leszno, a Polish motorcycle racing team
 Loadable kernel module, an object code file used to extend the kernel of a computer's operating system
 Lokomotivbau Karl Marx, a factory complex in East Germany, formerly owned by Orenstein & Koppel